Lorenzo Romar (born November 13, 1958) is an American basketball coach and former player.  He is the head men's basketball coach at Pepperdine University, a position he held from 1996 to 1999 and resumed in 2018.  Romar also served as the head men's basketball coach at Saint Louis University from 1999 to 2002 and the University of Washington from 2002 to 2017.

Playing career
Romar played college basketball at Cerritos College from 1976–78 and then for Washington from 1978 to 1980. After college, he was drafted by the Golden State Warriors and spent five years playing in the National Basketball Association (NBA).

Career statistics

NBA

Regular season

|-
| align="left" | 1980–81
| align="left" | Golden State
| 53 || - || 13.7 || .412 || .333 || .683 || 1.1 || 2.6 || 0.5 || 0.1 || 4.1
|-
| align="left" | 1981–82
| align="left" | Golden State
| 79 || 11 || 15.9 || .504 || .200 || .823 || 1.2 || 2.9 || 0.8 || 0.2 || 6.2
|-
| align="left" | 1982–83
| align="left" | Golden State
| 82 || 64 || 26.0 || .465 || .303 || .743 || 1.7 || 5.5 || 1.2 || 0.1 || 7.6
|-
| align="left" | 1983–84
| align="left" | Golden State
| 3 || 0 || 5.0 || .400 || .000 || .500 || 0.3 || 0.3 || 0.0 || 0.0 || 2.0
|-
| align="left" | 1983–84
| align="left" | Milwaukee
| 65 || 9 || 15.5 || .460 || .125 || .722 || 1.4 || 3.0 || 0.8 || 0.1 || 6.0
|-
| align="left" | 1984–85
| align="left" | Milwaukee
| 4 || 0 || 4.0 || .125 || .000 || .000 || 0.0 || 0.5 || 0.0 || 0.0 || 0.5
|-
| align="left" | 1984–85
| align="left" | Detroit
| 5 || 0 || 7.0 || .250 || .000 || 1.000 || 0.0 || 2.0 || 0.8 || 0.0 || 1.8
|- class="sortbottom"
| style="text-align:center;" colspan="2"| Career
| 291 || 84 || 17.8 || .464 || .211 || .749 || 1.3 || 3.5 || 0.8 || 0.1 || 5.9
|}

Playoffs

|-
| align="left" | 1983–84
| align="left" | Milwaukee
| 13 || - || 5.2 || .450 || .000 || .636 || 0.2 || 1.2 || 0.0 || 0.0 || 1.9
|- class="sortbottom"
| style="text-align:center;" colspan="2"| Career
| 13 || - || 5.2 || .450 || .000 || .636 || 0.2 || 1.2 || 0.0 || 0.0 || 1.9
|}

College

|-
| align="left" | 1978–79
| align="left" | Washington
| 27 || - || 19.8 || .508 || - || .721 || 1.4 || - || - || - || 6.0
|-
| align="left" | 1979–80
| align="left" | Washington
| 28 || - || 26.9 || .489 || - || .763 || 1.9 || 3.5 || 1.0 || 0.1 || 9.3
|- class="sortbottom"
| style="text-align:center;" colspan="2"| Career
| 55 || - || 23.4 || .496 || - || .745 || 1.6 || 3.5 || 1.0 || 0.1 || 7.7
|}

Coaching career

Early years
After the NBA, Romar played and coached for Athletes in Action. Romar was then hired as an assistant coach at the University of California, Los Angeles (UCLA) under head coach Jim Harrick from 1992 to 1996, and was credited with recruiting many of the players on the 1995 national championship team. Romar became the head coach at Pepperdine University and then at Saint Louis University before taking the job at Washington in 2002.

Washington
Romar was credited for turning around the University of Washington basketball program and generating new enthusiasm for the program. In 2004, Washington qualified for the NCAA tournament for the first time in five years. In 2005, Washington won the Pac-10 tournament and received a No. 1 seed in the NCAA tournament.  The Huskies made their way to the Sweet Sixteen for the first time since 1998, but were ousted by Louisville. In 2006, Washington earned a third consecutive NCAA tournament appearance and advanced to the Sweet Sixteen for the second consecutive year.

After failing to make the NCAA Tournament the next two years, Romar was named Pac-10 Coach of the Year for leading the Huskies to their first outright conference title since 1953. They earned a No. 4 seed in the NCAA tournament, but lost in the Second Round. The Huskies returned to the Sweet Sixteen the following year, but again lost. In 2011, the Huskies earned their third consecutive trip to the NCAA tournament. The trip marked the Huskies' last trip to the Tournament under Romar.

With a season-opening win over South Carolina State on November 14, 2014, Romar passed Marv Harshman to become the second-winningest coach in UW history.

After four years of near .500 seasons and five years without an NCAA Tournament appearance, Romar recruited his long-time friend Michael Porter Sr. to join the Huskies as an assistant coach in 2016. Michael Porter Sr. was expected to bring his two sons, Michael Porter Jr. and Jontay Porter, as commits to Washington. Michael Porter Jr. was widely considered the No. 1 recruit in the 2017 class. However, on March 15, 2017 following a dismal 9–22 season with future #1 pick Markelle Fultz leading the team, Romar was fired as head coach at Washington after 15 years. Romar ended his tenure at Washington with a record of 298–195. He made six NCAA Tournaments and three NITs, but had not made the NCAA Tournament in six straight years prior to his firing.

Arizona assistant coach
On April 16, 2017, it was announced that Romar had joined Sean Miller's staff at Arizona as associate head coach. On February 24, 2018, Romar was the interim head coach for one game after news broke the previous day that the FBI had reportedly intercepted phone conversations about Miller talking about paying Deandre Ayton to come to Arizona. Ayton would be the second straight #1 pick to be coached by Romar for at least one game.

Pepperdine (second stint)
Romar was announced as the new head men's basketball coach at Pepperdine on March 12, 2018, returning for his second stint with the school. On March 24, 2021, Romar's Waves beat Coastal Carolina 84-61 to win the 2021 College Basketball Invitational, securing the program's first-ever postseason championship.

Coaching style
Romar is known by his fellow coaches as one of the top basketball recruiters in the country. Additionally, he is respected as a genuine and optimistic person and was once voted "the opposing coach players would most like to play for" in a Pac-10 poll. In March 2006, Romar was given the prestigious Coach Wooden "Keys to Life" award for outstanding character.

Personal life
Romar is married to Leona Romar, with whom he has three daughters—Terra, Tavia and Taylor. In 2006, Lorenzo Romar and his wife Leona founded the Lorenzo Romar Foundation for the prevention of domestic violence and educational assistance for disadvantaged youth as well as other charitable causes.

Head coaching record

Awards and honors
 NCAA champion (1995, as assistant coach)
 John Wooden "Keys to Life" Award (2006)
 Pac-10/12 John R. Wooden Coach of the Year (2005, 2009, 2012)

References

External links
 Pepperdine profile
 Arizona profile

1958 births
Living people
African-American basketball coaches
African-American basketball players
American men's basketball coaches
American men's basketball players
Arizona Wildcats men's basketball coaches
Basketball coaches from California
Basketball players from Los Angeles
Cerritos Falcons men's basketball players
College men's basketball head coaches in the United States
Detroit Pistons players
Golden State Warriors draft picks
Golden State Warriors players
Milwaukee Bucks players
People from South Gate, California
People from Greater Los Angeles
Pepperdine Waves men's basketball coaches
Point guards
Saint Louis Billikens men's basketball coaches
UCLA Bruins men's basketball coaches
Washington Huskies men's basketball coaches
Washington Huskies men's basketball players
21st-century African-American people
20th-century African-American sportspeople